Beginning in 2012, dozens of mostly Muslim girls and women traveled to Iraq and Syria to join the Islamic State (IS), becoming brides of Islamic State fighters. While some traveled willingly, others were brought to Iraq and Syria as minors by their parents or family.

Many of those women subsequently acquired high public profiles, either through their efforts to recruit more volunteers, when they died or because they recanted and wished to return to their home countries.  Commentators have noted that it will be hard to differentiate between the women who played an active role in atrocities and those who were stay-at-home housewives.

Statistics

References

20th-century women
21st-century women
Expatriates in Iraq
Expatriates in Syria
Islamic State of Iraq and the Levant members
ISIL
Women in war in the Middle East